

Playoff seedings, results, and schedules

Quarter-finals

(1) Unicaja Malaga (26-7) vs. (8) Adecco Estudiantes (17-17)
Unicaja Malaga win the series 3-0 
Game 1 May 18 @ Malaga: Unicaja Malaga 84, Adecco Estudiantes 78 
Game 2 May 21 @ Madrid: Adecco Estudiantes 73, Unicaja Malaga 88 
Game 3 May 25 @ Malaga: Unicaja Malaga 80, Adecco Estudiantes 75 

(2) TAU Cerámica (25-9) vs. (7) Akasvary Girona (18-16)
 TAU Ceramica win the series 3-1 
Game 1 May 18 @ Vitoria-Gasteiz: TAU Cerámica 80, Akasvayu Girona 68 
Game 2 May 21 @ Girona: Akasvayu Girona 83, TAU Cerámica 74 
Game 3 May 25 @ Vitoria-Gasteiz: TAU Cerámica 93, Akasvayu Girona 84 
Game 4 May 28 @ Girona: Akasvayu Girona 67, TAU Cerámica 73 

(3) Winterthur FCB (24-10)  vs. (6) Real Madrid Baloncesto (19-15)
Winterthur FCB win the series 3-1
Game 1 May 19 @ Barcelona: Winterthur FCB 79 Real Madrid-Teka 67 
Game 2 May 21 @ Madrid: Real Madrid-Teka 70, Winterthur FCB 88 
Game 3 May 26 @ Barcelona: Winterthur FCB 74, Real Madrid-Teka 84 
Game 4 May 28 @ Madrid: Real Madrid-Teka 68, Winterthur FCB 83 

(4) DKV Joventut (23-11) vs. (5) Gran Canaria Grupo Dunas (20-14)
 DKV Joventut win the series 3-0 
Game 1 May 18 @ Badalona: DKV Joventut 81, Gran Canaria Grupo Dunas 70 
Game 2 May 21 @ Las Palmas de Gran Canaria: Gran Canaria Grupo Dunas 69, DKV Joventut 72 
Game 3 May 25 @ Badalona: DKV Joventut 81, Gran Canaria Grupo Dunas 76

Semifinals
These four teams classified for the semifinals will play the Euroleague for the 2006/2007 season.
The other best two teams are classified for the ULEB Cup.

(1) Unicaja Malaga (26-7) vs. (4) DKV Joventut (23-11)
 Unicaja Malaga win the series 3-2
Game 1 June 2 @ Málaga: Unicaja Malaga 80, DKV Joventut 66 
Game 2 June 4 @ Málaga: Unicaja Malaga 76, DKV Joventut 61 
Game 3 June 9 @ Badalona: DKV Joventut 76, Unicaja Malaga 68 
Game 4 June 11 @ Badalona: DKV Joventut 84, Unicaja Malaga 75 
Game 5 June 13 @ Málaga: Unicaja Malaga 88, DKV Joventut 75 

(2) TAU Cerámica (25-9) vs. (3) Winterthur FCB (24-10)
 TAU Cerámica win the series 3-0
Game 1 June 1 @ Vitoria-Gasteiz: TAU Cerámica 96, Winterthur FCB 83 
Game 2 June 4 @ Vitoria-Gasteiz: TAU Cerámica 71, Winterthur FCB 66 
Game 3 June 8 @ Barcelona: Winterthur FCB 78, TAU Cerámica 84

TV coverage
La2
Teledeporte
FORTA

ACB Finals
(1) Unicaja Malaga (26-7) vs. (2) TAU Cerámica (25-9)
 Unicaja Malaga win the series 3-0
Game 1 June 16 @ Málaga: Unicaja Malaga 81, TAU Ceramica 67 
Game 2 June 18 @ Málaga: Unicaja Malaga 83, TAU Ceramica 78 
Game 3 June 21 @ Vitoria-Gasteiz: TAU Ceramica 72, Unicaja Malaga 76 

UNICAJA MALAGA: 2005/2006 ACB CHAMPION

MVP
 Jorge Garbajosa

Liga ACB playoffs
Playoffs